The Micromax Canvas 2 A110 is a dual-sim Android smartphone by Micromax Mobile which is a rebranded Chinese mobile Beidu Chi/ German Mobistel cynus T2 released on November 2012 that supersedes the Micromax Superphone Canvas A100. It was launched in November 2012 featuring a 1 GHz dual-core processor, 512 MB of RAM and a 5.0 IPS LCD screen.

Design
The Micromax Canvas 2 A110 has a slate form factor 5-inch IPS display with a resolution of 480x854 with 196 ppi. It is powered by a 1 GHz dual-core CPU, 512MB of RAM and runs on Android 4.0.4 ICS(Upgradable to Android 4.1.1).  The device has 4 GB internal storage of which 1.05 GB is user available that can be expanded up to 32GB via a microSD or mircroSDHC card. The rear of the Micromax Canvas 2 A110 has an 8MP camera with dual LED flash and the front has 0.3MP VGA camera for video-calling. The Micromax Canvas 2 A110 comes with preloaded apps such as M!Buddy, CricketFever, HookUp, Micromax MZone and the Micromax MStore.

Official Jelly Bean update for Micromax A110 Canvas 2 has been announced, Details.

Hardware
Micromax A110 Canvas 2 is powered by 1 GHz ARM Dual-Core Cortex A9 processor on  MediaTek's MT6577 SoC with PowerVR SGX531 GPU. It has 512 MB RAM.

References

  https://web.archive.org/web/20140111094554/http://micromax-phones.com/mobile/micromax-canvas-2-a110-2/

Android (operating system) devices
Smartphones
Micromax Mobile
Mobile phones introduced in 2012
Discontinued smartphones